Herbert Edward Coleman (June 18, 1923 – January 1, 1985) was an American football center who played three seasons in the All-America Football Conference with the Chicago Rockets and Baltimore Colts. He was drafted by the Boston Yanks in the twelfth round of the 1945 NFL Draft. He played college football at the University of Notre Dame and attended Chester High School in Chester, West Virginia.

Early years
Coleman was captain of his high school football and basketball teams at Chester High School.

College career
Coleman played for the Notre Dame Fighting Irish. He earned United Press International Second-team All-American honors in 1943.

Professional career
Coleman was selected by the Boston Yanks with the 113th pick in the 1943 NFL Draft.

Chicago Rockets
Coleman played in 36 games, starting 24, for the Chicago Rockets from 1946 to 1948.

Baltimore Colts
Coleman played in one game for the Baltimore Colts in 1948.

References

External links
Just Sports Stats

1923 births
1985 deaths
Players of American football from West Virginia
American football centers
Notre Dame Fighting Irish football players
Chicago Rockets players
Baltimore Colts (1947–1950) players
People from Chester, West Virginia